Forefront may refer to:

 Microsoft Forefront
 ForeFront Records
 Forefront (quartet), 2016 international contest winner